Florent Belemgnegré, better known by his stage name Floby, is an Ivorian-Burkinabé singer and musician. He sings in the French and Mòoré languages. His music uses African sounds such as the kora and djembe but also rap and electric guitar.

He is also known by the nicknames le King Zodanga, le Papa des Orphelins and le Kirikou d’Afrique.

Life and career 
Belemgnegré was born in the Bingerville suburb of Abidjan, Côte d'Ivoire. At age five, he moved to Burkina Faso and lived with grandmother, who was a griot. On 15 January 2017, Floby was made Noom Naaba or "Chief of the Atmosphere" of Andemtenga, in Kouritenga Province, by the customary canton chief.

Personal life 
, Floby has one daughter.

Awards 
Floby received two Kundé awards each in 2007, 2015 and 2016 and won the Golden Kundé in 2010.

Discography

Studio albums 

Mam Sooré (My Way) (2006)
Wuilgui Maam (Guide Me) (2009)
Wend'mi (2012)
M'pengda Wendé (2015)
Wakato (2018)
Wend'so (2021)

Extended plays/maxi singles 

Be Positif EP (2014)

Singles 

 Tu me connais (You know me) (2016)
Sugar Daddy (feat Tanya) (2021)

References

Living people
Burkinabé male singers
Year of birth missing (living people)
21st-century Burkinabé people